France competed at the 2011 World Aquatics Championships in Shanghai, China between July 16 and 31, 2011.

Medalists

Diving

France has qualified 5 athletes in diving.

Men

Women

Open water swimming

Men

Women

Mixed

Swimming

France qualified 21 swimmers.

Men

 * raced in heats only

Women

Synchronised swimming

France has qualified 10 athletes in synchronised swimming.

Women

Reserves
Joannie Ciociola
Charlotte Frackowiak

References

Nations at the 2011 World Aquatics Championships
2011 in French sport
France at the World Aquatics Championships